Guillaume de Sonnac (died 6 April 1250) was Grand Master of the Knights Templar from 1247 to 1250.

Personal life 
Sonnac was born to a noble family in the French region of Rouergue. No date of birth survives for the Grand Master. He was described by Matthew Paris as "a discreet and circumspect man, who was also skilled and experienced in the affairs of war".

De Sonnac was an established member of the order before his election as Grand Master. He was the Preceptor of Aquitaine in France for the Templars and arrived in the Holy Land around autumn of 1247, finding "the remnants of the Kingdom of Jerusalem in a precarious state. Grand Master Armand de Périgord had been taken prisoner at the Battle of La Forbie in 1244, and after negotiations for his release failed two years later, De Sonnac was proposed as a replacement. Before his first year in the East was out, he was the order's new leader.

Military record

The Seventh Crusade 
De Sonnac's tenure was a particularly violent one. By 1247, the Christians had lost power bases in Tiberias, Mount Tabor, Belvoir and Ascalon. This prompted a fresh campaign from King Louis IX of France, who landed at Limassol, Cyprus on 17 September 1248. De Sonnac sailed from Acre to meet him and make preparations. Shortly after, the new Grand Master received an Emir from the Sultan, offering the crusaders a peace deal. De Sonnac related this to the French King, who ordered him to cease any negotiations without gaining Royal permission first. This ensured the new campaign would be concluded with violence, not diplomacy.

The Siege Of Damietta 
On 5 June 1249, the French crusader army, combined with de Sonnac and his Templar knights, attempted to land in Egypt. They targeted Damietta, just as the Fifth Crusade had years earlier. Fighting on the Egyptian beaches was heavy and the King fought in waist-high water alongside the troops. After a prolonged battle, the Muslims were forced to retreat, leaving the city almost undefended. The next day the de Sonnac wrote to Robert of Sandford, telling how on the morning after the battle, Damietta had been seized with only one crusader casualty.

At the end of November, de Sonnac and King Louis began their march to Cairo, via Mansurah.

Battle of Mansurah 
De Sonnac's next engagement was at the Battle of Mansurah, for the city containing the area's defensive force, the last obstacle to central Egypt. The Muslims had been protected by the swollen Nile, but on 8 February 1250, a local Bedouin showed them where they could cross. De Sonnac, Robert of Artois, the King's brother and William Longespee, leader of the English troops, launched an assault on the Muslim force without the main Frankish army. Taken by surprise, the Egyptians quickly retreated from the riverbank into the city and the Count foolishly gave chase, outnumbered and with no back-up from the bulk of the French forces.

Jean de Joinville claimed that the Count meant to follow on his own and that the rest of the raiding party did so as to not look cowardly. The Templars "thought that they would be dishonored if they allowed the Count to go before them". However, another source, Matthew Paris, reported that de Sonnac was forced into the assault by the Count. Robert was "bellowing and swearing disgracefully as is the French custom", and blaming the Templars and other religious orders for causing the real downfall of the Kingdom. Disgusted, de Sonnac returned to his men and prepared to chase down the numerically superior enemy.

Whatever the fact, the three commanders charged into Mansurah with tired men and no reinforcements and were quickly drawn into heavy fighting. Completely surrounded, "like an island in the sea", de Sonnac refused to surrender and his Templars fought to the last man. Earl Longespee was killed in the fighting, and the Count either fell in combat or drowned fleeing to safety. De Sonnac's escape from the city would make him a famous warrior, when many had considered him more suited to diplomacy. With heavy wounds, only one eye and two remaining knights of the original 280, he fought through the Egyptian army and out of the city, where he found the main Frankish army. He refused to rest and after receiving medical attention he returned and helped repulse a Muslim raiding party.

Battle of Fariskur 
The Christian forces camped outside the city and were under constant attack. A major assault was launched by the Muslims on 6 April and de Sonnac joined the Frankish charge to meet the enemy. He fought along the riverbank until he was finally overwhelmed by the attackers. Blinded fully by a second injury to the head, he was hacked down and killed by Muslim troops.

His death and the capture of Louis IX marked an end to the seventh crusade. He was succeeded as Grand Master by Renaud de Vichiers.

Chronicler 
De Sonnac was the first Grand Master to formally record the intricacies of the Templar hierarchy.  He added this to existing archives, codified them and stored them in a safe place so that the order would have accurate records in future years. It is certainly ironic that, for a man responsible for creating the order's most in-depth records, there is no indication of when he was born.

In fiction 
Guillaume de Sonnac is a prominent character in Crusades, a graphic novel by Izu, Alex Nikolavitch, and Zhang Xiaoyu, published by Les Humanoïdes Associés, in which he is show as a power hungry plotter.

References 

1250 deaths
Christians of the Sixth Crusade
Christians of the Seventh Crusade
Grand Masters of the Knights Templar
Military personnel killed in action
Year of birth unknown
13th-century French people
French people with disabilities
Royalty and nobility with disabilities